The Black Parade/Living with Ghosts is a reissue of American rock band My Chemical Romance's third studio album The Black Parade (2006). The reissue combines the original album, along with several unreleased demos and live tracks during the recording of The Black Parade, titled Living with Ghosts.

Background
The band's previous release was in March 2014 titled May Death Never Stop You: The Greatest Hits 2001–2013, a greatest hits album containing material spanning their entire career, as well as some previously unreleased material.

Release and promotion
On July 20, 2016, the band posted on their official Twitter and Facebook pages a video of a flag bearing the then-new "MCRX" icon with the piano intro from "Welcome to the Black Parade", ending with a cryptic date, "9/23/16". The video was also published on the band's YouTube channel with the video titled "MCRX". This led to numerous rumors and reports on the band's possible reunion, fueled by speculation from fans that noted the band deleted their break-up announcement from Twitter, and further boosted by attention from notable names in rock music, including Hayley Williams and Alex Gaskarth. The date was revealed to be for the release of the 10th anniversary reissue of The Black Parade with unreleased demos, to be released on September 23. A reunion would not occur until three years later.

Two months before its release, an early version of "Welcome to the Black Parade", titled "The Five of Us Are Dying", was made available for streaming and the album was available for pre-order. On My Chemical Romance's official website, the band dedicated the reissue to their late A&R executive Craig Aaronson who died on October 29, 2014, stating:

Track listing

Personnel 
My Chemical Romance
 Bob Bryar – drums, percussion
 Frank Iero – guitars, backing vocals
 Ray Toro – guitars, backing vocals
 Gerard Way – lead vocals
 Mikey Way – bass guitar

Charts

References 

2016 compilation albums
Reissue albums
My Chemical Romance compilation albums
Albums produced by Rob Cavallo
Reprise Records albums